Safwan Mbaé (born 20 April 1997) is a professional footballer who plays as a defender for Championnat National 2 club Saint-Malo. Born in France, he plays the Comoros national team.

Club career

Monaco
Mbaé made his professional debut on 26 April 2017 in the Coupe de France semi-final against Paris Saint-Germain. He started the game and played the whole match in a 5–0 away loss, during which he scored an own goal in the 51st minute.

GOAL FC 
In September 2020, Mbaé signed for GOAL FC on a free transfer.

International career

Born in France, Mbaé is of Comorian descent and also holds Comorian citizenship. Mbaé was called up by the Comoros on 23 August 2019. He made his international debut for the Comoros on 1 September 2021 during the 7–1 friendly win against the Seychelles, their biggest win ever.

Career statistics

References

External links
 BDFutbol profile (in English)

1997 births
Living people
Footballers from Paris
Comorian footballers
Comoros international footballers
French footballers
French sportspeople of Comorian descent
Association football defenders
AS Monaco FC players
CD Teruel footballers
GOAL FC players
US Saint-Malo players
Championnat National 2 players
Tercera División players
Segunda División B players
French expatriate footballers
French expatriate sportspeople in Monaco
French expatriate sportspeople in Spain
Expatriate footballers in Monaco
Expatriate footballers in Spain